Alfred Edward Watson (31 August 1888 – 6 May 1957) was an Australian cricketer. He played four first-class matches for Tasmania between 1926 and 1928.

Watson moved from Victoria to Tasmania in 1924. He made his first-class debut in March 1926 at the age of 37, when he represented Tasmania against the Australian team that was on its way to England. The Australian XI won by an innings and 184 runs, but Watson took four wickets.

Watson married Florence Hillard in Melbourne in March 1913. They had five sons. She died in Melbourne in August 1955. He died in Melbourne in May 1957.

See also
 List of Tasmanian representative cricketers

References

External links
 

1888 births
1957 deaths
Australian cricketers
Tasmania cricketers
Cricketers from Melbourne